Commercial is the sixth studio album recorded by Venezuelan band Los Amigos Invisibles released on June 9, 2009. In 2009 the album won the Latin Grammy Award for Best Alternative Music Album.

Track listing

References

Los Amigos Invisibles albums
2009 albums
Spanish-language albums
Latin Grammy Award for Best Alternative Music Album